Pelaya is a town and municipality in the Colombian Department of Cesar.

References

External links
 Pelaya official website
 Gobernacion del Cesar, Pelaya

Municipalities of Cesar Department